The 2001 IIHF InLine Hockey World Championship was the fifth IIHF InLine Hockey World Championship, the premier annual international inline hockey tournament. It took place in Ellenton, Florida, United States, with the gold-medal game played on July 22, 2001.

Championship

Preliminary round

Group A

Group B

Playoff round

Placement games

11th place game

9th place game

7th place game

5th place game

Semifinals

Bronze medal game

Gold medal game

References

IIHF InLine Hockey World Championship
2001 in inline hockey